Ouwster-Nijega  is a village in De Fryske Marren in the province of Friesland, the Netherlands. It had a population of around 85 in 2017.

History
The village was first mentioned in 1505 as Oester Nyegae, and means new village in the Ouwer region. In 1840, it was home to 29 people.

Before 2014, Ouwster-Nijega was part of the Skarsterlân municipality and before 1984 it was part of Doniawerstal.

References

External links

De Fryske Marren
Populated places in Friesland